Rudy J. Castellani Jr is professor of pathology at the University of Maryland in Baltimore, Maryland  where he also serves as Director of Neuropathology.

References

External links
 Rudy J. Castellani, Jr., MD Google Scholar Profile

Living people
American pathologists
University of Maryland, Baltimore faculty
Year of birth missing (living people)